KSS Limited (formerly known as K Sera Sera Limited) was incorporated in September 1995, is headquartered in Mumbai and is a publicly listed company, currently listed on the BSE, NSE and delisted from the Luxembourg Stock Exchange. KSS has produced and distributed over 100 films and produced over a dozen movies. KSS, as it is commonly known, focuses on the entertainment film business; with three business entities focusing on digital cinema rollout, the building of miniplex cinema screens, and alternative content programming in cinema theatres, respectively.

History
The company was established on 14 September 1995 as Garnet Paper Mills Limited and was renamed in 2002 as K Sera Sera Production Limited and as K Sera Sera Limited on 10 February 2011.

K Sera Sera Digital Cinema Private Limited 
K Sera Sera Digital Cinema Private Limited was formerly known as K Sera Sera Technologies Private Limited and changed its name to K Sera Sera Digital Cinema Private Limited in April 2011. The company was incorporated in 2009 and is based out of Mumbai, India. K Sera Sera Digital Cinema Private Limited operates as a subsidiary of KSS Limited.

K Sera Sera's - Studio Virtual Worlds 
K Sera Sera Box Office Pvt. Ltd., partnered with filmmakers Mahesh Bhatt and Vikram Bhatt to create Studio Virtual Worlds.

K Sera Sera Miniplex 
K Sera Sera Miniplex was set up in 2010 as a division of K Sera Sera Limited. It has many cinema screens in different locations across Indian cities.

Chhotu Maharaj Cinema 
Chhotu Maharaj founded in year 2018 an initiative by K Sera Sera Group. It has many cine restaurants in different locations across Indian cities.

Filmography 
The company has produced / distributed following films and television shows:

Films produced

Films distributed

Television

References

External links

Film production companies based in Mumbai
Television production companies of India
Film distributors of India
1993 establishments in Maharashtra
Indian companies established in 1993
Mass media companies established in 1993
Companies listed on the National Stock Exchange of India
Companies listed on the Bombay Stock Exchange